Saamund Olsen Bergland (24 May 1881 – ?) was a Norwegian state auditor and politician.

He was born in Fyresdal to Ole Torkelsen Vatnedal and Anne Saamundsdatter Nedrebø. He was elected representative to the Storting for the period 1931–1933, for the Labour Party. He served as Auditor General 1949–1950.

References

1881 births
Year of death missing
People from Fyresdal
Labour Party (Norway) politicians
Members of the Storting
Auditors general of Norway